This list describes woody plant encroachment specific to different ecoregions of the world. The list is further subdivided into countries. Although political boundaries usually have limited influence on the occurrence of woody plant encroachment in an ecosystem, this structure provides insight into country-specific scientific research and responses.

Ecoregions

Northern Europe

Scandinavia 
Woody encroachment is common in the Alpine tundra of Norway and Sweden Also in the Coastal meadows of Estonia woody plant encroachment is observed, resulting from land abandonment. In Ireland and Denmark, dry grasslands are affected by woody encroachment.

United Kingdom 
In the United Kingdom, shrub encroachment in heathlands may lead to the loss of ecosystem carbon, as carbon losses from the soil will not be offset by above-ground carbon in the additional biomass.

Ireland 
In Ireland extensive low input farming helps to prevent further encroachment by Blackthorn and Hazel, while high density stands are actively thinned out.

Central Europe and European Alps 
Areas that formerly were forests require continuous maintenance to avoid woody plant encroachment. When active land cultivation ends, fallow land is the result and gradual spread of shrubs and bushes can follow. Animal species once native to Central Europe effectively countered this natural process. These include herbivores such as European bison, auerochs (extinct), red deer and feral horse. Grassland and heath are considered to require protection due to their biodiversity as well as to preserve cultural landscapes. Woody plant encroachment is therefore frequently countered with selective removal of woody biomass or through the seasonal or year-round introduction of grazing animal species, such as sheep, goats, heck cattle or horses. Bush encroachment occurs in the Alps, where structural change in agriculture leads to the abandonment of land. Alnus viridis is the most widely distributed shrub species in the sub-alpine zone and is found to severely impair species richness and beta diversity when encroaching grassland. Woody encroachment in the alpine tundra is associated with aboveground carbon storage and a slowdown of the biogeochemical cycle. 70 percent of cultivated land in the Eastern Alps are affected by woody encroachment. Also in Hungary bush encroachment is linked to the abandonment of formerly cultivated land. Moderate encroachment is found to have no negative impact on biodiversity and suppression of woody plants is considered an effective restoration approach.

Mediterranean Basin 
The Mediterranean region is widely reported to be affected by bush encroachment, which is often a transition into the establishment of trees in former grasslands. This is found to have negative effects on biodiversity and to magnify climate and related droughts. Further, it adversely affects soil organic matter. At the same time encroaching shrubs are also found to have a positive effect, reversing the desertification process. Areas experiencing woody encroachment have more extended droughts and higher usage of deep water and this is expected to increase under future climate scenarios. In the Spanish Pyrenees, woody encroachment is connected to land abandonment and affects around 80 percent of cultivated land. It is increasingly observed that the cessation of land use is not the only driver of woody encroachment in the Mediterranean Basin, as the phnomenon also occurs in areas that continue to be used for agriculture.

North American grasslands 
North American grasslands have been found to be affected by woody plant encroachment. Documentation of shrub encroachment caused by fire exclusion was documented as early as 1968.

United States of America 
In the United States, affected ecosystems include the Chihuahuan Desert, the Sonoran Desert, the northern and southern Rocky Mountains, the sagebrush steppe, as well as the Southern and Central Great Plains. Poor grazing management and fire suppression are among the documented causes. In particular, historic livestock overgrazing has contributed to woody plant encroachment.

Woody plant expansion is considered one of the greatest contemporary threats to mesic grasslands of the central United States. Woody encroachment is estimated to lead to a loss of 75% of potential grass biomass in the Great Plains. In the western United States, 25% of rangelands experience sustained tree cover expansion, with estimated losses for agricultural producers of $5 billion since 1990. The forage lost annually is estimated to be equal to the consumption of 1.5 million bison or 1.9 million cattle.  Woody plants have increased on around 44 million hectares in the western United States since 1999. Among encroaching species is Piñon-juniper which mostly encroaches in shrubland adjacent to wooded areas. Up to 350 sagebrush-associated plant and animal species are threatened as a result. In the northern Great Basin piñon-juniper has encroached 0.45 million hectares since 2001 alone. The rate at which grassland is lost to woody encroachment is found to equal the rate of conversion of grassland to agricultural land. Also the tundra ecosystems of Colorado and Alaska are affected by the rapid expansion of woody shrubs. In coastal fen ecosystems, woody plant encroachment leads to the reduction of herbaceous species richness and loss of rare species.

Negative impacts on forage production and an interrelation with carbon sequestration are documented. At the same time in the semiarid karst savanna of Texas, USA, woody plant encroachment has been found to improve soil infiltrability and therewith groundwater recharge. At the same time a conversion of rangelands to redcedar woodland has been modeled to result in a 20-40% reduction in streamflow and therewith the amount of water available. Over a period of 69 years, woody encroachment in Texas has increased aboveground carbon stocks by 32%. Bird population decline as a result of woody encroachment has been identified as a critical conservation concern, with bird populations found to have decreased by nearly two-thirds over the last half-century.

Through government funded conservation programmes, shrubs and trees are thinned out systematically in affected ecosystems. This is found to revive habitat for birds and improve other ecosystem services. There is evidence that selective thinning with post-treatment has successfully reversed the effects of conifer encroachment in studied areas. At the same time study areas in Nebraska, where Juniperus virginiana encroachment was treated with fire, showed that woody cover stayed low and stable for 8–10 years after fire treatment, but rapid re-encroachment then followed. In the Loess Canyons community driven partnerships among land owners for the purpose of coordinated prescribed fires, has shown to successfully halt and reverse woody plant encroachment, with positive effects for rangeland productivity and bird species richness. A notable initiative is the Prairie Project, funded by the United States Department of Agriculture, aiming to render the Great Plains more resilient against woody plant encroachment through targeted fire and grazing regimes. USDA conservation programs amount to close to $90 million annually in public and private funds for bush control and rangeland health.

Latin American grasslands

Argentina 

In the Gran Chaco intense shrub encroachment has detrimental impact on livestock economies, especially in the Formosa Province. Livestock pressure and the lack of wildfires have been main causes. Woody encroachment ist also observed in the savanna ecosystems of the central Argentine Espinal as well as the lower Argentine Monte.

Bolivia 
In Bolivia, different stages of woody plant encroachment threaten the habitat of the Guacano.

Brazil 

Wide-ranging woody encroachment is found in the Cerrado, a savannah ecosystem in central Brazil. Studies found that 19% of its area, approximately 17 million hectares, show significant woody encroachment. Among the researched causes are fire suppression and land use abandonment. Fire suppression is linked to Brazil's conservation policy that aims at deforestation in the Amazon, but achieves the limitation of fires also in the Cerrado. This ecological change is linked to the disturbance of ecohydrological processes. In some areas of the Cerrado, open grassland and wetlands has largely disappeared. 

A contributing factor to the loss of the natural Cerrado savanna ecosystem is the planting of monocultures, such as pine, for wood production. When pine is removed and plantations abandoned, areas turn into low-diversity forests lacking savanna species. A 20-year study found that woody encroachment led to reduced species diversity and richness. Also in the highland grassland of Southern Brazil, bush encroachment caused by land management changes is seen as a significant threat biodiversity, human wellbeing and cultural heritage in grassland ecosystems.

Studies show that woody encroachment in the Cerrado has a significant impact on rodent species abundance, with positive effects for forest specialists and negative effects for grassland specialists.

Research has been conducted on the effectiveness of controlled fires as a means to control woody encroachment.

Nicaragua 
In Nicaragua Vachellia pennatula is known to encroach due to land intensification as well as land abandonment.

Caribbean Islands

Cuba 
The Republic of Cuba experiences woody plant encroachment, mainly by Dichrostachys cinerea (locally called marabú). Encroacher wood is actively harvested and used for charcoal production and considered for electricity production.

Asian temperate savanna and steppe

China 

Temperate savanna-like ecosystems in Northern China are found to be affected by shrub encroachment, linked to unsustainable grazing and climate change. In Inner Mongolia, shrub encroaches steppe. Woody plant encroachment is found to lead to the reduction of biodiversity and decreased forage quality. Rare herbaceous plants and those with lower stature are at risk of extinction. In Yunnan Province in Southwest China, the loss and fragmentation of savanna due to woody encroachment is found to be larger than the loss of forests. In the Tibetan Plateau, woody encroachment is found to be one of the main grassland disturbance factors. Among the encroaching species is Potentilla fruticose.

India
Semi-arid Banni grasslands of western India are found to be affected by bush encroachment, with affects both species composition and behaviour of nocturnal rodents.

Australian lowland woodlands 
In Australia woody encroachment is observed across all lowland grassy woodland as well as semi-arid floodplain wetlands and coastal ecosystems, with substantial implications for biodiversity conservation and ecosystem services. Prescribed fire and adapted grazing regimes have been found to successfully reduce some encroaching species and restore grasslands. While the optimal fire regime is context specific, generally late dry season burning every 4 years was found to be most effective in Australia.

Eastern African grasslands 
Across Eastern Africa, including protected areas, woody encroachment has been noted as a challenge. It has first been documented in the 1970s, with scientists indicating that woody encroachment is the rule rather than the exception in East Africa.

Ethiopia 

Grasslands in the Borana Zone in southern Ethiopia are found to be effected by bush encroachment, specifically by Senegalia mellifera, Vachellia reficiens, Vachellia bussei and Vachellia oerfota. Woody plants constitute 52% of vegetation cover. This negatively affects species richness and diversity of plant species. Experiments have shown the effectiveness of bush control of different woody species by cutting and stem-burning, cutting with fire-browse combination, cutting and fire as well as cutting and browsing. Post-management techniques were effective in sustaining savanna ecology. In the Bale lowlands, woody encroachment is found to have increased by 546% between 1990 and 2020, transforming grassland into bushland.

Woody encroachment has been found to reduce herbage yield and therewith rangeland productivity. Under woody encroachment, less meat and milk is produced per head of cattle, which challenges traditional pastoral diets. The management of bush encroachment is found to stabilize rangelands and contribute to food security.

Woody encroachment has also been observed in protected areas, such as the Nech Sar National Park.

Also the invasive species Prosopis juliflora has expanded rapidly since it was introduced in the 1970s, with direct negative consequences on pasture availability and therewith agriculture. Prosopis is native to Central America and was introduced in an attempt to halt land degradation and provide a source of firewood and animal fodder, but has since then encroached into various ecosystems and become a main driver of degradation. The Afar Region is most severely affected. The wood of the invasive species is commonly used as household fuel in the form of firewood and charcoal.

Shrub encroachment in forest areas of Ethiopia, such as the Desa’a Forest, reduces carbon stocks.

Kenya 
In Kenya, woody encroachment has been identified as a main type of land-cover change in grasslands, reducing the grazing availability for pastoralists. Studied areas show an increase of woodland by 39% and a decrease of grassland by 74%, with Vachellia reficiens and Vachellia nubica as a dominant species. Observed causes include overgrazing, suppression of wildfires, the reduction of rain as well as the introduction of bush seeds through smallstock Older studies had suggested that an increase in bush cover by 10% reduces grazing by 7%, and grazing is eliminated completely by 90% bush cover. Also Euclea divinorum is a dominant encroaching species. Adaptation strategies include the integration of browsers into the livestock mix, for example goats and camels. In areas where Acacia mellifera encroaches, manual bush thinning during the late dry season combined with reseeding of native grasses and soil conservation measures, proved to be an effective restoration measure with 34% improvement in perennial grass cover.

In the Baringo County of Kenya, up to 30% of grasslands have disappeared due to the invasion of Prosopis juliflora. Clearing Prosopis juliflora to restore grasslands can increase soil organic carbon and generate value through carbon credit schemes.

Tanzania 
In Tanzania woody encroachment has been studied in the savanna ecosystem of the Maswa Game Reserve, with detected shrub growth rates of up to 2.6% per annum. Vachellia drepanolobium is dominant species. Moreover, observed increases of shrubland in the Serengeti Plains are attributed to woody plant encroachment.

Uganda 
Bush encroachment in Uganda is found to have negative impacts on livestock farming. In selected study areas farm income was twice as high on farm that implemented bush control, compared to farms with high bush densities.

West African Guinean and Sudanian savannas 

Bush encroachment is observed across several West African countries, especially in the Guinean savanna and the Sudanian savanna.

Burkina Faso 
In Burkina Faso, wood plant encroachment threatens savannas. Particularly the livestock sector is negatively affected. Among the methods used to control bush densities are manual bush removal and prescribed fires. Fire exclusion is identified as a driver of woody encroachment.

Ivory Coast 
In Ivory Coast late dry season fires were found to reduce bush encroachment in the Guinean savanna. Fire exclusion is found to be a driver of woody encroachment.

Ghana 
In Ghana, woody encroachment is linked to fire exclusion.

Cameroon 
In Cameroon, among the regions affected by bush encroachment is Adamawa Region, near the Nigerian border. It has been labelled "pastoral thickets" due to the suspected relation to livestock grazing pressure. Among the areas affected, is the Mbam Djerem National Park.

Central African Republic 
In the 1960s pastoral land in the Central African Republic was mapped and bush encroachment attributed to livestock pressure as well as reduced fire intensity.

Southern African Savanna

Namibia 

Bush encroachment is estimated to affect up to 45 million hectares of savanna in Namibia. As a result, agricultural productivity in Namibia has declined by two-thirds throughout the past decades. The phenomenon affects both commercial and communal farming in Namibia, mostly the central, eastern and north-eastern regions. Also in national parks that feature a mixed land use of cattle herding and wildlife, bush encroachment has been observed. In the Bwabwata National Park, a long-term data analysis for the period 1996-2019 has revealed biodiversity losses due to woody encroachment. Common encroacher species include Dichrostachys cinerea, which is most dominant in areas with higher precipitation.

The government of Namibia has recognised bush encroachment as a key challenge for the national economy and food safety. In its current National Development Plan 5, it stipulates that bush shall be thinned on a total of 82.200 hectares per annum. The reduction of bush encroachment on 1.9 million hectares until 2040 is one of Namibia's primary Land Degradation Neutrality Targets under the UNCCD framework. The Government of Namibia pursues a value addition strategy, promoting the sustainable use of bush biomass, which in turn is expected to finance bush harvesting operations. Existing value chains include wood briquettes for household use, woodchips for thermal and electrical energy generation (currently used at Ohorongo Cement factory and at Namibia Breweries Limited), export charcoal, biochar as soil enhancer and animal feed supplement, animal feed, flooring and decking material, predominantly using the invasive genus Prosopis, wood carvings, firewood and construction material, i.e. wood composite material.

Increasingly, the encroaching bush is seen as a resource for a biomass industry. Economic assessments were conducted to quantify and value various key ecosystem services and land use options that are threatened by bush encroachment. The evaluation was part of the Economics of Land Degradation (ELD) Initiative, a global initiative established in 2011 by the United Nations Convention to Combat Desertification, the German Federal Ministry for Economic Cooperation and Development, and the European Commission. Based on a national study, cost-benefit analysis suggests a programme of bush control to generate an estimated and aggregated potential net benefit of around N$48.0 billion (USD 3.8 billion) (2015 prices, discounted) over 25 years when compared with a scenario of no bush thinning. This implies a net benefit of around N$2 billion (USD 0.2 billion) (2015 prices, discounted) per annum in the initial round of 25 years.

Namibia has a well-established charcoal sector, which currently comprises approximately 1,200 producers, which employ a total of 10,000 workers. Most producers are farmers, who venture into charcoal production as a means to combat bush encroachment on their land. However, increasingly small enterprises also venture into charcoal making. As per national forestry regulations, charcoal can only be produced from encroaching species. In practice, it however proves difficult to ensure full compliance with these regulations, as the charcoal production is highly decentralised and the inspection capacities of the Directorate of Forestry are low. Voluntary FSC certification has sharply increased in recent years, due to respective demand in many off-take countries, such as the United Kingdom, France and Germany. Due to exclusive use of encroacher bush for charcoal production, rendering the value chain free from deforestation, Namibian charcoal has been dubbed the "greenest charcoal" in an international comparison. In 2016 the Namibia Charcoal Association (NCA) emerged as a legal entity through a restructuring process of the Namibia Charcoal Producers Association, previously attached to Namibia Agricultural Union. It is a non-profit entity and the official industry representation, currently representing an estimated two-thirds of all charcoal producers in the country.

Namibia Biomass Industry Group is a non-profit association under Section 21 of the Companies Act (Act 28 of 2004) of Namibia, founded in 2016. It functions as the umbrella representative body of the emerging bush-based biomass sector in the country with voluntary paid membership. The core objectives, as enlisted in the Articles of Association, include to develop market opportunities for biomass from harvested encroacher bush as well as to address industry bottlenecks, such as skills shortages and research and development needs. The De-bushing Advisory Service is a division of the association, mandated with the dissemination of knowledge on the topics of bush encroachment, bush control and biomass use. Services are provided upon inquiry and are considered a public service and therefore not charged. According to its websites, services include technical advice on bush control and biomass use, environmental advice, the strengthening of existing agricultural outreach services and linkage with service providers.

In 2019, the three Namibian farmers' unions (NNFU, NAU/NLU, NECFU) together with the Ministry of Agriculture, Water and Forestry published a best strategy document called "Reviving Namibia's Livestock Industry". The document states that the Namibian livestock industry is in decline due to the loss of palatable perennial grasses and the increase in bush encroachment. Namibia's rangelands show higher levels of bare ground, lower levels of herbaceous cover, lower perennial grass cover, and higher bush densities over large areas. Bush thickening leads to direct competition for moisture with desirable forage species and detrimentally influences the health of the soil. The best practice document identifies tried and tested practices of both emerging and established farmers from communal and title deed farms. These practices include the Split Ranch Approach, several Holistic Management approaches and the Mara Fodder Bank Approach. Other best practices include bush thinning, landscape re-hydration and fodder production. The unions state that there is major scope for enhancing livelihoods through the sustainable use of bush products. In addition, increased profitability and productivity of the sector will have a major impact on the 70% of the Namibian population that depends directly or indirectly on the rangeland resource for their economic well-being and food security.

Both the Forestry Act and the Environmental Act of Namibia govern bush control. Special harvesting permits as well as Environmental Clearance Certificates are applicable to all bush harvesting activities. Responsible Authority is the Ministry of Environment, Forestry and Tourism. Effective April 2020 the Forest Stewardship Council introduced a national Namibian FSC standard (National Forest Stewardship Standard) that is closely aligned to the global FSC certification standard, but takes into consideration context specific parameters, such as bush encroachment. In early 2020, the total land area certified under the FSC standard for the purpose of bush thinning and biomass processing was reported to amount to 1.6 million hectares.

Botswana 

Bush encroachment in Botswana has been documented from as far back as 1971. Around 3.7 million hectares of land in Botswana is affected by bush encroachment, that is over 6% of the total land area. Encroaching species include Acacia tortilis, Acacia erubescens, Acacia mellifera, Dichrostachys cinerea, Grewia flava, and Terminalia sericea. Ecological surveys found bush encroachment affecting both communal grazing areas and private farmland, with particular prevalence in semi-arid ecosystems. Encroachment is considered a key form of land degradation, mainly because of the country's significant dependence on agricultural productivity. In selected areas, charcoal production has been introduced as a measure to reduce bush densities.

South Africa 
In South Africa bush encroachment entails the abundance of indigenous woody vegetation in grassland and savanna biomes. These biomes make up 27.9% and 32.5% of the land surface area. About 7.3 million hectares are directly affected by bush encroachment, impacting rural communities socio-economically. Common encroaching species include Vachellia karoo, Senegalia mellifera, Dichrostachys cinera, Rhus undulata and Rhigozum trichotomum.

The South African Government addresses woody plant encroachment in the Conservation of Agricultural Resources Act of 1983, defining indicators of bush encroachment. Through the public works and conservation programme Working for Water, the government of South Africa allocated approximately 100 million USD per annum for the management of native encroaching species. Land users in South Africa commonly combat woody encroachment through clear felling, burning, intensive browsing or chemical control in the form of herbicide application. Studies have found a positive effect of bush thinning on grass biomass production over short periods of time. Studies on the efficacy of controlled fires to combat woody encroachment are ongoing, among others in the Kruger National Park. This research has shown that high-intensity fires may reduce woody encroachment in the short-term, but not in the mid-term. The Kruger National Park is largely affected by bush encroachment, which highlights that global drivers cause encroachment also outside typical rangeland settings. The presence of large wildlife like elephants is found to prevent woody encroachment at Kruger National Park, but at the same time presents a challenge for the persisistance of big trees. There is evidence of woody encroachment in the Free State National Botanical Garden.

In communal areas, woody plant encroachment is a key catalyst of land degradation.

Lesotho 
In 1998, around 16% of Lesotho's rangelands where estimated to be affected by woody encroachment, linked to grazing pressure. Encroaching species include Leucosidea sericea and Chrysocoma and a negative impact of water catchment areas is suspected.

Eswatini 
Studies in the Lowveld savannas of Eswatini confirm different heavy woody plant encroachment, especially by Dichrostachys cinerea, among other factors related to grazing pressure. In selected study areas the shrub encroachment increased from 2% in 1947 to 31% in 1990. In some affected areas, frequent fires, coupled with drought, reduced bush densities over time.

Zambia 
Woody encroachment has been recorded in southern Zambia. Between 1986 and 2010 woody cover increased from 26% to 45% in Kafue Flats and Lochinvar National Park. A common encroacher species is Dichrostachys cinerea.

Zimbabwe 
There is evidence of woody plant encroachment in Zimbabwe, among others by Vachellia karroo. Document notions of woody encroachment in Zimbabwe and its impact on land use date back to 1945.

Other ecoregions 
There is evidence of woody encroachment by Acacia leata, Acacia mellifera, Acacia polyacantha, Acacia senegal and Vachellia seyal in Sudan.

Reference map 
The following map displays the countries that are addressed in this article, i.e. countries that feature ecosystems with woody encroachment.

 Purple – Countries with evidence of woody plant encroachment after land intensification
 Yellow – Countries with evidence of woody plant encroachment after land abandonment

References 

Environmental issues